Dr. Pavithran is an Indian film scriptwriter and lyricist who predominantly works in Malayalam cinema. He has been the scriptwriter for more than 50 films. He has also written around 50 songs for 12 Malayalam films.

Partial filmography

Dialogue

 Vyaamoham
 Mannu
 Sikharangal
 Vadakaveedu 
 Oru Raagam Pala Thaalam
 Oothikachiya Ponnu
 Sreemaan Sreemathi 
 Chappa
 Oru Thira Pinneyum Thira 
 Priyasakhi Raadha 
 Dhrohi 
 Post Mortem
 Ente Katha 
 Chakravaalam Chuvannappol 
 Mortuary 
 Aayiram Abhilaashangal 
 Karimbu 
 Ardha Raathri

Screenplay

 Vyaamoham (1978)
 Mannu (1978)
 Sikharangal (1979)
 Vadakaveedu (1979)
 Oru Raagam Pala Thaalam (1979)
 Oothikkaachiya Ponnu (1981)
 Oru Thira Pinneyum Thira (1982)
 Priyasakhi Raadha (1982)
 Postmortem (1982)
 Ente Kadha (1983)
 SChakravaalam Chuvannappol (1983)
 Mortuary (1983)
 Aayiram Abhilaashangal (1984)
 Karimbu (1984)
 Sree Narayanaguru (1986)
 Ardha Raathri (1986)

Story
 Oru Raagam Pala Thaalam (1979)
 Mortuary (1983)
 Sree Narayanaguru (1986)

Lyrics
 Poovaadithorum ...	Thalirukal	1967	
 Akashaveedhiyil ...	Thalirukal	1967	
 Pularippon ...	Thalirukal	1967	
 Pakaroo Gaanarasam ...	Thalirukal	1967	
 Pandu Pandoru Kaattil ...	Thalirukal	1967	
 Kuthichu Paayum ...	Thalirukal	1967	
 Paadano Njan Paadano ...	Vilakkappetta Bandhangal	1969
 Paadume Njan Paadume ...	Vilakkappetta Bandhangal	1969	
 Swarnamukilukal Swapnam ...	Vilakkappetta Bandhangal	1969
 Penninte Kannil ...	Vilakkappetta Bandhangal	1969	
 Kaiviral Thumbonnu ...	Vilakkappetta Bandhangal	1969	
 Varavaayee Vellimeen Thoni ...	Jalakanyaka	1971	
 Ezhu Kadalodi ...	Jalakanyaka	1971	
 Aaro Aaro Aaraamabhoomiyil ...	Jalakanyaka	1971	
 Aadyaraavil Aathiraraavil ...	Jalakanyaka	1971	
 Onne Onne Po Po ...	Jalakanyaka	1971	
 Naadha Varoo Prananaadha ...	Preethi	1972	
 Kannuneeril ...	Preethi	1972	
 Kizhakku Ponmalayil ...	Preethi	1972	
 Adharam Madhuchashakam ...	Preethi	1972	
 Umma Tharumo ...	Preethi	1972	
 Kanna Kaarvarnna [Thoovenna Kandal] ...	Preethi	1972	
 Paalaazhithira ...	Sooryakanthi	1977	
 Maanathaare ...	Sooryakanthi	1977	
 Poovaadikalil [D] ...	Vyaamoham	1978	
 Neeyo Njaano ...	Vyaamoham	1978	
 Oro Poovum Viriyum Pulari Pon ...	Vyaamoham	1978	
 Poovaadikalil [F] ...	Vyaamoham	1978	
 Akalangalile ...	Mannu	1978	
 Devi Bhagavathi ...	Mannu	1978
 Evideyo Thakaraaru ...	Mannu	1978	
 Kunnin Meloru ...	Mannu	1978	
 Ninakku Njaan Swantham ...	Sikharangal	1979	
 Ammayilla achanilla ...	Sikharangal	1979	
 Swapnangalkkarthangal undaayirunnenkil ...	Ormakale Vida Tharoo	1980	
 Jeevitha Nritham ...	Ormakale Vida Tharoo	1980	
 Kaarmukil ...	Ormakale Vida Tharoo	1980	
 Doore Neelavaanam ...	Ormakale Vida Tharoo	1980	
 Enikkaay nee janichu ...	Aasha	1982	
 Aashe aare chaare ...	Aasha	1982	
 Marubhoomiyile ...	Aasha	1982	
 Aashe aare chaare (sad) ...	Aasha	1982	
 Mathimukhi Nin ...	Shila	1982	
 Neelaambarathile Neeraalasayyayil ...	Shila	1982
 Prema raagam ...	Shila	1982	
 Prapancha veena ...	Ente Kadha	1983

References

Malayalam screenwriters
Malayalam-language lyricists